Capital Circle is a three-quarter, non-limited-access beltway around the western, southern and eastern sides of Tallahassee, Florida in the United States.

For the western half, see State Road 263
For the eastern half, see U.S. Route 319/State Road 261

Roads in Leon County, Florida
Transportation in Tallahassee, Florida
Beltways in the United States
U.S. Route 19